Terrell Lowe (born May 12, 1998) is an American soccer player for PDX FC in the National Premier Soccer League.

Career
Terrell Lowe spent his youth years playing for PVSC Galaxy in Pocatello, Idaho. The team had success winning 2 State Titles, That team also consisted of his two older (twin) brothers, Tevin and Trent. In 2012 Terrell moved to Arizona to train/play with Real Salt Lake's academy.

After spending time with Real Salt Lake's academy in Arizona, Lowe moved to Portland Timbers academy. While at the academy, Lowe appeared for Portland Timbers 2, coming on as an 84th minute substitute during a 3-1 victory over Vancouver Whitecaps FC 2 on August 17, 2015.

Lowe left Portland to play college soccer at the University of Virginia in 2016, where he made twenty appearances. On May 11, 2017, Lowe returned to Portland Timbers 2.

References

External links
USSF Development Academy bio

1998 births
Living people
American soccer players
Portland Timbers 2 players
Virginia Cavaliers men's soccer players
Association football midfielders
Soccer players from Idaho
USL Championship players
United States men's youth international soccer players